Bioversity International is a global research-for-development organization that delivers scientific evidence, management practices and policy options to use and safeguard agricultural biodiversity to attain global food and nutrition security, working with partners in low-income countries in different regions where agricultural biodiversity can contribute to improved nutrition, resilience, productivity and climate change adaptation.

Bioversity International is a member of the CGIAR, a global research partnership for a food-secure future.

The organization is highly decentralized, with about 300 staff working around the world. Its headquarters are in Rome's Maccarese borough, Italy, with regional offices located in Central and South America, West and Central Africa, East and Southern Africa, Central and South Asia, and South-east Asia.

In 2019, Bioversity International joined with the International Center for Tropical Agriculture (as the Alliance of Bioversity International and CIAT) to "deliver research-based solutions that harness agricultural biodiversity and sustainably transform food systems to improve people’s lives".

Background 
Bioversity International is a research-for-development organization focused on safeguarding and using agricultural biodiversity to help meet challenges such as adaptation to climate change and increased sustainable production.

The organization takes the view that the diversity of plants and animals offers opportunities not only through breeding but also by delivering many other benefits. Some are direct, such as the better nutrition and greater sustainability that come with locally adapted crops. Others are indirect, like the ecosystem services delivered by healthy populations of pollinators, biological control agents, and soil microbes. Agricultural biodiversity will also be absolutely essential to cope with the predicted impacts of climate change, not simply as a source of traits but as the underpinnings of more resilient farm ecosystems.

Governance 
Bioversity International is governed by a Board of Trustees, including one Trustee nominated by the host country (Italy) and one nominated by FAO. The Board also appoints the Director General who manages the operation of the various programs. The current Director General is Juan Lucas Restrepo.

History
In 2014, Bioversity International marked 40 years of operations. Bioversity International was originally established by the CGIAR as the International Board for Plant Genetic Resources (IBPGR) in 1974. In October 1993, IBPGR became the International Plant Genetic Resources Institute (IPGRI) and in 1994 IPGRI began independent operation as one of the centers of the CGIAR. At the request of the CGIAR, in 1994 IPGRI took over the governance and administration of the International Network for the Improvement of Banana and Plantain (INIBAP). In 2006, IPGRI and INIBAP became a single organization and subsequently changed their operating name to Bioversity International. Bioversity International still maintains the world's largest banana gene bank, the Bioversity International Musa Germplasm Transit Centre, that is hosted at the Katholieke Universiteit Leuven (KU Leuven) in Leuven, Belgium, and manages ProMusa - a platform that shares knowledge about bananas and plantains. In 2002, the Global Crop Diversity Trust was established by Bioversity International on behalf of the CGIAR and the UN Food and Agriculture Organization, through a Crop Diversity Endowment Fund.

Publications
Bioversity International and its predecessors have published occasional papers under the title Issues in Genetic Resources. In 2017, the organization published Mainstreaming Agrobiodiversity In Sustainable Food Systems - Scientific Foundations for an Agrobiodiversity Index, a book that put the spotlight on the importance of agrobiodiversity as the foundation of our food supplies.

Notes

External links 
 
 Global Crop Diversity Trust
 European Cooperative Programme for Plant Genetic Resources
 
 

Agricultural research institutes
International research institutes
International environmental organizations
Biodiversity
Plant genetics
Sustainable agriculture
Environmental organizations established in 1974
Agricultural organisations based in Italy
Organisations based in Rome